The Romanian-language surname Păun (meaning "peacock") may refer to:

Emilian Galaicu-Păun
Gabriel Badea-Päun
Georgian Păun
Gheorghe Păun
Ion Păun
Ion Păun-Pincio
 Nicolae Păun (politician)
 Nicolae Păun (footballer)
Paul Păun,  Romanian and Israeli avant-garde poet and visual artist
Vasile Păun

Romanian-language surnames